Murickassery is a major market and educational centre in the Idukki district of Kerala state, South India. This is a village of migrant farmers and migrants has been developing as an important centre of Idukki. Various spice products provide the life blood for this village and market. Murickassery is situated in Vathikkudy Grama Panchayath.Thopramkudy  is the nearst town.

Transport
Murickassery is 20.9 km away from Painavu, which is the district capital of Idukki district. Murickassery is well connected with all parts of highranges. It serve as a connecting point of various major highrange roads including:
 Murickassery – Adimali – Munnar
 Murickassery – Thopramkudy – Kattappana – Kumily
 Murickassery – Thopramkudy – Nedumkandam- Cumbum
 Murickassery – Karimban – Cheruthoni – Painavu – Moolamattom – Muttom – Thodupuzha
 Murickassery – Rajapuram
 Murickassery – Vannappuram – Thodupuzha

 Murickassery – Vannappuram – Muvattupuzha /Kothamangalam – Cochin
 Murickassery – Thopramkudy -Kattappana
 Murickassery –Thopramkudy - Kattappana –  Elappara – Kottayam
 Murickassery –Thopramkudy  Kattappana – Kumily – Thekkadi
 Murickassery – Adimali – Munnar- Eravikulam National Park
 Murickassery – Adimali – Munnar – Chinnar Wildlife Sanctuary

Education
The people of the region consider Murickassery, a centre of education which is affordable to them. Pavanatma College is the backbone of this small centre of education. St Mary's Higher Secondary school has enlightened two generation of students. Now they live in various parts of the world. This was also a place for private tutorial colleges and tuition centres. Unemployed youths found bread from these small educational institutions. Lower middle class farmers of Murickassery and nearby villages including Thopramkudy, Padamugham, Moongappara, Parathode, Mannathara, Rajamudy, Pathinaramkandam, Poomamkandam, Kambilikandam, Melechinnar etc. find a better place for school and college education in Murickassery.

List of Schools and Colleges

References

Cities and towns in Idukki district